
Gmina Pątnów is a rural gmina (administrative district) in Wieluń County, Łódź Voivodeship, in central Poland.

Villages
Gmina Pątnów contains the villages and settlements of Bieniec, Budziaki, Bukowce, Cieśle, Dzietrzniki, Gligi, Grabowa, Grębień, Józefów, Kałuże, Kamionka, Kluski, Madeły, Pątnów, Popowice, Troniny, Załęcze Małe and Załęcze Wielkie.

Neighbouring gminas
Gmina Pątnów is bordered by the gminas of Działoszyn, Lipie, Mokrsko, Praszka, Rudniki, Wieluń and Wierzchlas.

References
Polish official population figures 2006

Patnow
Wieluń County